The 3rd Crunchyroll Anime Awards were held on February 16, 2019, honoring excellence in anime from 2018. Crunchyroll announced the details for the third edition of the awards on December 4, 2018. The list of judges as well as the categories to be presented were announced on December 17. Public voting was conducted from January 11 to 18. Winners were announced on February 16 via a livestream on Twitch. The show was hosted by voice actress Cristina Vee. Several prominent figures in the industry and community were invited to presented the awards, including Kevin Penkin, who previously won the 2018 award for Best Score.

This edition featured 15 categories, including new industry-related categories such as Best VA Performance for both Japanese and English, Best Character Design, and Best Director. However, the award for Best Score was not given. It also dropped genre-specific awards such as Best Drama and Best Comedy, as well as the categories first introduced in the previous edition such as Best CGI and Best Manga. The award for Best Fight Scene was reinstated after it was dropped in the previous edition. Megalo Box received the most nominations at eight, followed by Devilman Crybaby at seven and Aggretsuko and Violet Evergarden both at six. Japanese rock band The Pillows received two nominations in the Best Ending Sequence for the second and third seasons of FLCL, the first band and anime to do so.

Devilman Crybaby won the Anime of the Year. Its director, Masaaki Yuasa, won the first Best Director award. My Hero Academia's Izuku Midoriya won the Best Boy award after being nominated for the third straight time. The franchise also received the most wins. Mamoru Miyano won the inaugural Best VA Performance (JP) award for his role as Kotaro Tatsumi in Zombie Land Saga, while Christopher Sabat received his second award as he won the Best VA Performance (EN) award for role as All Might in My Hero Academia. Character designer Takahiro Kishida won the inaugural Best Character Design award for his work on JoJo's Bizarre Adventure: Golden Wind. My Hero Academia was also nominated for the third straight time in the Best Animation category; however, it was won by Violet Evergarden. Its theatrical film Two Heroes won Best Film. Masahiko Minami, producer and Bones' president, received the Industry Icon award. He attended the show personally to accept the award.

Winners and nominees

Statistics

References

2019 awards in the United States
February 2019 events in the United States
Crunchyroll